Jean Louis Ebénézer Reynier (14 January 1771 – 27 February 1814) was a Swiss-French military officer who served in the French Army under the First Republic and the First Empire. He rose in rank to become a general during the French Revolutionary Wars and led a division under Napoleon Bonaparte in the French campaign in Egypt and Syria. During the Napoleonic Wars, he continued to hold important combat commands, eventually leading an army corps during the Peninsular War in 1810–1811 and during the War of the Sixth Coalition in 1812–1813.

Background and education
Reynier was born on 14 January 1771 in Lausanne to a protestant family, the son of Jacques François Reynier, a physician, and Caroline Chapuis. Through his father he was descended from French Huguenots from the Dauphiné who fled to Switzerland after the revocation of the Edict of Nantes. His brother Jean-Louis-Antoine (1762–1824), a naturalist and archeologist, held government posts in the French administration in Egypt and Naples. 

In March 1790, Reynier entered the École des ponts et chaussées in Paris. He was granted French citizenship through the 1791 constitution, which guaranteed right of return to descendants of French individuals who had fled the country due to religious persecution under the ancien régime.

French Revolutionary Wars

Reynier joined the French Army as a gunner in 1792 and was drafted in October into the Army of the North, in which he saw action at the Battle of Jemappes that year and at Neerwinden in 1793. He was promoted to brigade general in January 1795, and received the assignment of chief of staff of the Army of the Rhine and Moselle under Moreau in March 1796, soon becoming general of division in November of the same year. 

Reynier participated in Napoleon's conquest of Malta and the following Egyptian campaign in 1798, commanding a division at the Battle of the Pyramids and, in 1799, at the sieges of El Arish and Acre. Later, under the command of General Jacques-Francois Menou he defended against the British counter-invasion of Egypt in 1801. His division was present but not engaged in the Battle of Alexandria. After returning to France, Reynier killed a fellow general in a duel and was under a cloud for a time.

Napoleonic Wars

On his return to duty in 1803, Reynier went to fight in Italy with the army of Marshal André Masséna, whom he later replaced as head of the Army of Naples in 1807. On 24 November 1805, his 2nd Division helped capture Prince Henri Louis de Rohan's 4,400 Austrians at the Battle of Castelfranco Veneto. Reynier's 6,000 Frenchmen routed the 10,000-man army of the Bourbon Kingdom of Naples and Sicily at the Battle of Campo Tenese on 9 March 1806. This victory helped Napoleon to install his brother Joseph Bonaparte on the throne of the newly created Napoleonic Kingdom of Naples. On 4 July of that year, a British raiding force inflicted a severe drubbing on an overconfident Reynier at the Battle of Maida in southern Italy. Reynier was later able to reassert French control of the area via the French victory at Mileto and served under King Joseph as his Minister of War and Marine.

During the Battle of Wagram in 1809, Reynier commanded 129 artillery pieces and 8,475 soldiers on the Island of Lobau. This impressive array of cannon helped stop a dangerous flanking attack by Johann von Klenau's Austrian VI Armeekorps. Sent to the Iberian Peninsula in 1810, he commanded the II Corps under Masséna at the Battle of Bussaco, the Lines of Torres Vedras, and the Battle of Sabugal in Portugal. Before Bussaco, Reynier and other generals urged Masséna to order the assault which turned out to be unsuccessful. His corps was not seriously engaged at the Battle of Fuentes de Onoro in Spain. In 1811, Napoleon named him a Count of the Empire.

During the Russian campaign of 1812, Reynier led the VII Corps which was composed of Saxon troops. Together with an allied Austrian force under Karl Schwarzenberg, he operated well to the south of the major fighting. After fighting inconclusive battles with the Russians at Gorodeczna and Wolkowysk, he retreated when he learned of the main army's disaster.

Leading the Saxon corps plus an attached French division, Reynier fought at the battles of Kalish, Bautzen, Grossbeeren and Dennewitz in 1813. During the Battle of Leipzig, his Saxon troops suddenly changed sides. When a key bridge was blown up too quickly, Reynier was trapped and captured with his remaining French soldiers. 

Reynier was released after being exchanged for the Austrian general Maximilian von Merveldt, also captured at Leipzig, and arrived in Paris on 15 February 1814. He died of gout nearly two weeks later, on 27 February. Pastor Paul-Henri Marron presided over his funeral at the Oratoire du Louvre on 10 March. Reynier was buried in the Panthéon.

His name is inscribed in column 24 on the southern pillar of the Arc de Triomphe as REYNIER, right above that of fellow Vaudois volunteer Laharpe.

References

Further reading
 Bowden, Scotty & Tarbox, Charlie. Armies on the Danube 1809. Arlington, Texas: Empire Games Press, 1980.
 Chandler, David. Dictionary of the Napoleonic Wars. New York: Macmillan, 1979. 
 Chandler, David. The Campaigns of Napoleon. New York: Macmillan, 1966.
 Horward, Donald (ed.), Pelet, Jacques. The French Campaign in Portugal 1810-1811. Minneapolis, Minn.: University of Minnesota Press, 1973. 
 Smith, Digby. The Napoleonic Wars Data Book. London: Greenhill, 1998.

External links
 
 
 

French generals
French commanders of the Napoleonic Wars
French Republican military leaders of the French Revolutionary Wars
1771 births
1814 deaths
Names inscribed under the Arc de Triomphe
Swiss military personnel of the Napoleonic Wars
People from Lausanne
Swiss people of French descent
Burials at the Panthéon, Paris
French prisoners of war in the Napoleonic Wars
Swiss emigrants to France
Counts of the First French Empire
Grand Officiers of the Légion d'honneur
École des Ponts ParisTech alumni